Peter Evans (May 27, 1950 – May 20, 1989) was an American actor.  He won the 1976 Clarence Derwent Award and was nominated for a Drama Desk Award for his portrayal of Richie in David Rabe's Streamers.  However, he was best known for his role as Russ Merman in the 1980s sitcom 9 to 5.

Early life and education
Evans was born in 1950 in Englewood, New Jersey, to Dudley and Caroline Evans.  He had a brother, John Randall, and a sister, Elizabeth Temple.  He attended Phillips Academy, Andover.  In 1972, he graduated from Yale University.  For three years, Evans attended the Central School of Speech and Drama.

Career

Theatre
In 1975, Evans made his debut in the New York theater with David Storey's Life Class.  In 1976, Mike Nichols directed him in David Rabe's Streamers, in which he portrayed Richie.  His performance as Richie won him the Clarence Derwent Award and garnered him a Drama Desk Award nomination.  In 1977, he appeared opposite Ellis Rabb in David Mamet's A Life in the Theatre.  In 1979, he appeared opposite Maggie Smith in Tom Stoppard's Night and Day.  In 1982, Evans played James Leeds in a Broadway production of Mark Medoff's Children of a Lesser God.

Television
In 1977, he appeared in the PBS miniseries Best of Families.  In 1979, Evans reprised his role in a television film adaptation of A Life in the Theatre.  He also portrayed Russ Merman in the 1980s sitcom 9 to 5. He was in an episode of St. Elsewhere in 1984.

Film
Evans appeared in the films Impostors (1979) and Arthur (1981).

Personal life and death
Evans resided in Los Angeles for the last several years of his life.  He died on May 20, 1989, from complications of AIDS at the age of 38 in Century City Hospital in Los Angeles.

References

External links
 
 
 

1950 births
1989 deaths
American male stage actors
American male television actors
AIDS-related deaths in California
Yale University alumni
Clarence Derwent Award winners
Male actors from New Jersey
People from Englewood, New Jersey
Male actors from Los Angeles
20th-century American male actors